Cerithiopsis barleei is a species of minute sea snail, a marine gastropod mollusc in the family Cerithiopsidae. This species is known from Cape Verde, in the Mediterranean Sea, and in the European part of the Atlantic Ocean. It was described by Jeffreys in 1867.

References

  Hallgass A. (1985). Cerithiopsis acuminata Monterosato ms. una specie sconosciuta. Notiziario del C.I.S.MA. 6 (1-2): 9-14
 Monterosato T. A. (di) (1878 (aprile)). Note sur quelques coquilles draguées dans les eaux de Palerme. (Trad. H. Crosse). Journal de Conchyliologie 26: 143-160
 Gofas, S.; Le Renard, J.; Bouchet, P. (2001). Mollusca. in: Costello, M.J. et al. (eds), European Register of Marine Species: a check-list of the marine species in Europe and a bibliography of guides to their identification. Patrimoines Naturels. 50: 180-213
 Rolán E., 2005. Malacological Fauna From The Cape Verde Archipelago. Part 1, Polyplacophora and Gastropoda.
 Dyntaxa. (2013). Swedish Taxonomic Database. Accessed at www.dyntaxa.se

External links
 Jeffreys J.G. (1862-1869). British conchology. Vol. 1: pp. cxiv + 341 [1862. Vol. 2: pp. 479 [1864]. Vol. 3: pp. 394 [1865]. Vol. 4: pp. 487 [1867]. Vol. 5: pp. 259 [1869]. London, van Voorst]

barleei
Molluscs of the Atlantic Ocean
Gastropods of Cape Verde
Gastropods described in 1867